Miryam Shomrat (Hebrew: מרים שמרת) was the Israeli ambassador to Norway from 2005 until 2008 and ambassador to Finland from 2000 until 2003.

While ambassador to Norway, Shomrat publicly criticized King Harald, Queen Sonja and Prime Minister Jens Stoltenberg for not supporting the cause of the Jews. In a televised interview she said: "I think a gesture from the royal household to the Jewish community on the eve of the (Jewish) New Year would have been in place anyway, certainly a show of solidarity after the shooting incident would have been in place.  Forgive me for saying it so openly, but I do think it is a very important gesture which should be taken." Shomrat was reacting to a shooting in September 2006 at a synagogue in Oslo and her response was seen as inappropriate, including from the local Norwegian Jewish community.

References

External links
Israeli ambassador: “Reconsider your stand”

Israeli women ambassadors
Ambassadors of Israel to Norway
Ambassadors of Israel to Finland
Living people
Year of birth missing (living people)